History of slavery in the Muslim world refers to various periods in which a slave trade has been carried out under the auspices of Arab peoples or Arab countries. Examples include:
 Trans-Saharan slave trade
 Indian Ocean slave trade
 Barbary slave trade
 Slavery in Tunisia
 Slavery in Libya
 Slavery in Sudan
 Slavery in Mauritania
 Slavery in Yemen

See also 
 History of slavery in the Muslim world
 Qiyān
 Saqaliba
Slavery in the Ottoman Empire

Slave trade
Slavery in Africa
Slavery in Asia
African slave trade